Medscape is a website providing access to medical information for clinicians; the organization also provides continuing education for physicians and health professionals. It references medical journal articles, Continuing Medical Education (CME), a version of the National Library of Medicine's MEDLINE database, medical news, and drug information (Medscape Drug Reference, or MDR). At one time Medscape published seven electronic peer reviewed journals.

History
Medscape launched May 22, 1995 by SCP Communications, Inc. under the direction of its CEO Peter Frishauf.  In 1999, George D. Lundberg became the editor-in-chief of Medscape. For seventeen years before joining Medscape he had served as Editor of the Journal of the American Medical Association.

In September 1999, Medscape, Inc. went public and began trading on NASDAQ under the symbol MSCP. In 2000, Medscape merged with MedicaLogic, Inc., another public company. MedicaLogic filed for bankruptcy within 18 months and sold Medscape to WebMD in December 2001. In 2008, Lundberg was terminated by WebMD. The following year the Medscape Journal of Medicine ceased publishing. In January 2013, Eric Topol was named editor-in-chief of Medscape. The same year, Lundberg returned to Medscape as editor-at-large.

In 2009, WebMD released an iOS application of Medscape, followed by an Android version two years later. In 2015, WebMD launched Medscape CME & Education on iOS. In 2021, Medscape launched Medscape UK to expand their business in United Kingdom.

Criticism from Doctors

in 2012, Dr. Yoni Freedhoff, MD, Associate Professor of Family Medicine at the University of Ottawa and the medical director of the Bariatric Medical Institute wrote an article entitled "Why I Can No Longer Trust Medscape". In it he wrote that Medscape is "putting patients at risk by actively misinforming their physicians." He also noted poor vetting of studies that Medscape chooses to publish as his reason for stating this.

In 2016 a survey of Doctors found Web MD and its sister company Medscape to have incomplete medical information lacking depth and also numerous cases of misinformation on their sites. A study of Medscape and Web MD also found both services to lack neutrality and exhibiting bias potentially based on very high payments (compared to their industry competitors) from the pharmaceutical industry.

References

External links
 

American medical websites
Internet properties established in 1995